Teri Yaad may refer to
Teri Yaad (film) from 1948
Teri Yaad sataondi (Album) Sajjad Ali a Pakistani singer's music Albums in the year 2002.